My Beautiful Sinking Ship is an album by Devics, released on September 4, 2001.

Track listing
 "Heart and Hands" – 5:43
 "My Beautiful Sinking Ship" – 3:40
 "You in the Glass" – 3:45
 "The Man I Love" – 5:47
 "You Could Walk Forever" – 4:42
 "Alone With You" – 5:09
 "Why I Chose To Never Grow" – 3:19
 "Living Behind The Sun" – 4:03
 "Forget Tomorrow" – 5:52
 "Lost At Sea" – 1:48
 "Gold In The Girl" – 5:57
 "I Broke Up" – 4:01
 "Heaven Please" – 3:46
 "Five Seconds to Hold You" – 3:54
 "Blood Red Orange" – 1:58

2001 albums